Jodie Alicia Williams (born 28 September 1993) is a British sprinter who specialises in the 400 metres, having begun her career concentrating on 100 and 200 metres. A prodigious junior, she is the 2009 World Youth Champion at 100 and 200 m, the 2010 World Junior Champion at 100 m, the 2011 European Junior Champion at 100 and 200 m, and the 2013 European U23 Champion at 200 m.

Williams had a five-year-long unbeaten streak of 151 races in the sprints, beginning with the start of her athletics career in 2005 and lasting until July 2010, when she was runner-up to Stormy Kendrick in the 200 m at the World Junior Championships. Williams is the British youth record holder over the 60 m, 100 m and 200 m. At the age of sixteen, she was the top-ranked British woman over 200 m in 2010.

After a difficult beginning to her senior career following injuries, in 2014 Williams won her first senior medals, representing England at the 2014 Commonwealth Games; a bronze in the 4 × 100 metres relay, and a silver in the 200 metres. Weeks later she repeated the silver medal for 200 metres at the 2014 European Championships, before winning her first senior gold medal as part of the Great Britain relay team that broke the British Record in the 4 × 100 metres relay. At the 2022 European Championships, she was also part of British 4 x 400 quartet than ran the second fastest time ever (3:21.74) by a British women's team.

Background
Williams was born in Welwyn Garden City, Hertfordshire to an English father, Richard Williams, and an English mother of Trinidadian and Vincentian descent, Christine Williams. Both of her parents were county-level sprinters. Richard ran for Hertfordshire, while Christine ran for Sussex. She also has two siblings, her younger brother Ben and younger sister Hannah Williams.

Williams began to take athletics seriously when she was 13 years old.

Williams was educated at Heath Mount School and Queenswood School, Hertfordshire, before attending Dame Alice Owen's School, in Potters Bar, Hertfordshire.

Williams has been described as the "sort of athlete every country is waiting for" by former UK Athletics Head Coach, Charles Van Commenee, and has also been praised by Allyson Felix, who stated "I think Jodie has great potential. She's young but she can still accomplish a lot of things".

2009 World Youth Champion
She took the England Athletics Under-20 Championships in 100 m, in a time of 11.48 s. She then went to Brixen, Italy for the World Youth Championships to take part in the 100 m and 200 m. In the 100 m semi-final, she set a world-leading time for a youth athlete of 11.40 s. In the event final she ran 0.01 s quicker to clinch her first world title, defeating Ashton Purvis and Alison Peter. In the 200 m final, she ran another youth world leading time of 23.08 s to clinch another gold medal, making her the first girl to achieve a 100/200 m sprint double at the competition.

2010 World Junior Championships
In 2010, Williams started off her season in strong form – at the Loughborough Games, she broke the 200 m British junior record when she ran 22.79 s, beating a strong field including senior Olympian Joice Maduaka. A week later, at the Bedford International Games, she broke the 100 m British junior record when she ran 11.24 s. After winning both the events at the England Athletics U20 Championships, she set off for the 2010 World Junior Championships in Athletics, which were to be held in Moncton, Canada.

Williams carried on her unbeaten run by winning the 100 m final in a time of 11.40 s to make it 149 races unbeaten. After the race she said "I thought if I got off to a good start I’d be in with a good chance and that’s just what I did. I knew it was going be a close race and I wasn’t quite sure I could come out and perform again, so it’s obviously a huge relief and the pressure has lifted a bit."

The next day it was the 200 m. She came first in her heat and semi final. Williams was the fastest qualifier, but suffered her first defeat in her athletics career by coming second in the final to American Stormy Kendrick. In the 4 × 100 m relay the Great Britain team was eliminated due to a bad baton exchange between Williams and Rebekah Wilson.

2011 Indoor Season & Double European Junior Champion
In 2011, Williams became the youngest winner of the UK Indoor Championships over the 60 m, since 15-year-old Sonia Lannaman won in 1971. She ran a personal best of 7.24 s in a strong British field that included Bernice Wilson and Jeanette Kwakye. This led to an automatic qualification for the 2011 European Athletics Indoor Championships in Paris.

This has not been the first time that Williams had achieved a standard to make a senior Great Britain team, but this was the first time she had taken her place in the senior Great Britain team.

In Paris, Williams ran 7.21 s in the European Indoor Championships 60 m final, finishing fourth. She had missed out on a medal by 0.01 s, but despite this, she said she had "surprised herself".

At the European Athletics Junior Championships, Williams won the 100 m setting a new personal best and championship record of 11.18 s, breaking the previous record by 0.03 s. She explained "I've been training better than last year and my times in training have been better than last year so I knew I had 11.1 in me, I've just not had the right conditions until today."

Within 24 hours, she also won the 200 m in a season's best of 22.94 s – despite a strong headwind of −1.5 m/s to complete a sprint double, an unprecedented achievement for a British woman. To end the championships, she ran on the fourth leg of the 4 × 100 m relay to collect a bronze medal along with her teammates.

2012 Indoor Season & Missing the 2012 London Olympics
Williams ran a season's best time of 7.29 s and finished second behind Jeanette Kwakye at the Aviva UK Indoor Championships. She was subsequently chosen to run at the IAAF Indoor World Championships in Istanbul, Turkey. Before the championships began, Williams stated that her aim was to make the semi-finals at the championships. In the heat, she came 3rd with a time of 7.40 s and in the semi-final she came 5th with a time of 7.32 s and did not advance to the final.

After the World Indoor Championships, Williams announced that she was to focus on getting selected for the 100 m at the London 2012 Games. She stated, "Now it’s onwards and upwards for the Olympics. I’m really concentrating on the 100m because it’s always been a dream of mine to do the 100m at the Olympics."

Throughout the summer season, Williams was struggling with a number of injuries. Before the Olympic Trials, she had only raced once, which was a time of 11.87 s (-1.3), well down on her personal best at the Watford Open Graded Meeting.

At the Aviva Olympic Trials & UK Championships, Williams won her heat in 11.70 s (0.2) and came 4th in her semi-final in 11.66 s (-0.6). She had qualified for the final but was clearly not fully fit and heavily taped up. Unfortunately, Williams pulled up at the 60 m mark and appeared to pull her hamstring. With that result and injury, Williams ended her 2012 season.

Speaking about her injury-plagued 2012 season, Williams stated, "I just had so much going on and my body just started to break down. If someone had asked me before what my worst setback was, I would have said coming second at the world juniors, but this was a proper setback. That was my first real setback year. It was hard, as I'd not been used to dealing with setbacks before." She added, "It was tough to sit back and watch it, to see other people [competing], and thinking I could have been there at the home Olympics, but then I told myself I'm 18 and there's hopefully plenty more Olympics ahead of me. It wasn't nice sitting at home, and it took me a while to get over that."

2013 European Under 23 Champion & World Championships
In the aftermath of the London Olympics, Williams said, "My confidence took a knock as I didn't compete to the standard I would have liked to. It's hard not to have your confidence knocked from that. But I've had to just learn from the mistakes and move on." Commenting that she is now free of education and able to train full-time, "I don't know how I did the last few years." Talking about her expectations for the 2013 season, she said, "This year it's about getting into the senior worlds and taking it slow," she says. "But long term, the goal's still the same: to be the best in the world."

In 2013, Williams did not compete during the indoor season, to presumably continue with her rehabilitation after the 2012 injuries. Her first race after the injury at the UK Olympic Trials was an unusual distance of 250 m, in which she posted a time of 30.33 s. A few weeks later, she competed over a 150 m at the Manchester Street Games alongside Olympic Champion Allyson Felix, she ended up with an overall time of 16.81 s (-0.2) and went through the 100 m mark in 11.32 s (-0.2).

On the domestic scene, Williams comfortably clinched a 100 m/200 m double at the England Athletics U23 Championships winning the 100m at 11.56 s (0.7) and the 200 m at 23.21 s (0.5). With that, she qualified for the European Under 23 Championships in Tampere, Finland.

In Tampere, Williams continued her comeback by winning her 100 m heat and semi-final in 11.49 s (-0.2) and 11.44 s (-0.3) respectively. In the final, she came 2nd in a time of 11.42 (-0.7) behind Dafne Schippers. In the 200 m, Williams won her heat in a time of 23.09 s (-0.9). In the final, Williams posted a quicker time of 22.92 s (-0.5) to claim a gold medal at the European U23 Championships and her 6th age-group international title.

2014 Commonwealth Games and European Championships
In 2014, Williams struggled throughout the indoor season. After qualifying for the final of the British Athletics 60 m indoor final, she fainted and had to pull out. She finished her indoor season, posting a best time of 7.32 s.

On 19 April, Williams competed at the Tom Jones Memorial Invitational at Gainesville, Florida. Over the 100 m, she ran a time of 11.20 s (1.3). On the same day, she competed over the 200 m and ran a personal best time of 22.76 s (0.0). That result moved her up to joint 9th on the UK all-time list for 200 m.

In July 2014, Williams took part in the 2014 Commonwealth Games, Glasgow as a competitor for England.  She won her first heat in 23.42, progressing to the semi-finals where she finished second in a time of 22.64 behind Blessing Okagbare which allowed her to qualify automatically for the final.  In the final, Williams won silver in a new PB of 22.50, her first senior medal. The time moved her to equal second on the UK all-time list, alongside Abi Oyepitan and behind Kathy Cook. The race was won by Okagbare with Williams' compatriot, Bianca Williams finishing in third.

Later on during the 2014 Commonwealth Games, Williams was drafted into the 4 × 100 m relay team to contest the final. The England team that consisted of Williams, Bianca Williams, Ashlee Nelson & Asha Philip ran a time of 43.10 s to win a bronze medal behind Jamaica and Nigeria.

In August 2014, Williams took part in the 2014 European Championships in Zurich. She won her heat in 22.88s, progressing to the semi-finals, where she also won in a time of 22.90s. In the final, placed in lane 4, Williams won a silver in a new PB of 22.46s, her second individual senior medal in as many weeks. The time took her to second on the UK all-time list, behind Kathy Cook. The race was won by Dafne Schippers with France's Myriam Soumare finishing in third.

British Championships
Jodie became British champion for the second time when winning the 200 metres event at the 2019 British Athletics Championships and her sister Hannah then won the same title at the 2020 British Athletics Championships.

Outside Athletics
Williams has been used on many advertising campaigns, most recently the National Portrait Gallery 'Road to 2012: Aiming High' exhibition also featured Williams amongst many other athletes.

Williams has come runner-up to Tom Daley twice (2009 & 2010) for the BBC Young Sports Personality of the Year award.

Major competitive record

Personal bests

References

External links

Power of 10 profile for Jodie Williams.

1993 births
Living people
Sportspeople from Welwyn Garden City
English female sprinters
British female sprinters
Olympic female sprinters
Olympic athletes of Great Britain
Athletes (track and field) at the 2016 Summer Olympics
Athletes (track and field) at the 2020 Summer Olympics
Commonwealth Games silver medallists for England
Commonwealth Games bronze medallists for England
Commonwealth Games medallists in athletics
Athletes (track and field) at the 2014 Commonwealth Games
World Athletics Championships athletes for Great Britain
European Athletics Championships winners
World Youth Championships in Athletics winners
British Athletics Championships winners
European Athletics Rising Star of the Year winners
English sportspeople of Trinidad and Tobago descent
People educated at Heath Mount School
Medallists at the 2014 Commonwealth Games